Golconda (Telugu: గోల్కొండ, romanized: Gōlkōnḍa) is a historic fortress and ruined city located in the western outskirts of Hyderabad, Telangana, India. It was originally called Mankal. The fort was originally built by Kakatiya ruler Pratāparudra in the 11th century out of mud walls. It was ceded to the Bahmani Kings by Deo Rai, Rajah of Warangal during the reign of Sultan Muhammad Shah (1358–1375 A.D.) of the Bahmani Sultanate. Following the death of Sultan Mahmood Shah, the Sultanate disintegrated and Sultan Quli, who had been appointed as the Governor of Hyderabad by the Bahmani Kings, fortified city and made it the capital of the Golconda Sultanate. Because of the vicinity of diamond mines, especially Kollur Mine, Golconda flourished as a trade centre of large diamonds known as Golconda Diamonds. Golconda fort is currently abandoned and in ruins.

The complex was put by UNESCO on its "tentative list" to become a World Heritage Site in 2014, with others in the region, under the name Monuments and Forts of the Deccan Sultanate (despite there being a number of different sultanates).

History 

The origins of the Golconda fort can be traced back to the 11th century. It was originally a small mud fort built by Pratāparudra of the Kakatiya Empire. The name Golconda is thought to originate from Telugu for "shepherd's hill" (గొల్ల కొండ, romanized: Gullakōnḍa). It is also thought that Kakatiya ruler Ganapatideva 1199–1262 built a stone hilltop outpost — later known as Golconda fort — to defend their western region. The fort was later developed into a fortified citadel in 1518 by Sultan Quli of the Qutb Shahi Empire and the city was declared the capital of the Golconda Sultanate.

The Bahmani kings took possession of the fort after it was made over to them by means of a sanad by the Rajah of Warangal. Under the Bahmani Sultanate, Golconda slowly rose to prominence. Sultan Quli Qutb-ul-Mulk (r. 1487–1543), sent by the Bahmanids as a governor at Golconda, established the city as the seat of his governance around 1501. Bahmani rule gradually weakened during this period, and Sultan Quli (Quli Qutub Shah period) formally became independent in 1518, establishing the Qutb Shahi dynasty based in Golconda. It remained the capital of the Qutb Shahi dynasty until 1590 when the capital was shifted to Hyderabad. The Qutb Shahis expanded the fort, whose  outer wall enclosed the city.

During the early seventeenth century a strong cotton-weaving industry existed in Golconda. Large quantities of cotton were produced for domestic and exports consumption. High quality plain or patterned cloth made of muslin and calico was produced. Plain cloth was available as white or brown colour, in bleached or dyed variety. Exports of this cloth was to Persia and European countries. Patterned cloth was made of prints which were made indigenously with indigo for blue, chay-root for red coloured prints and vegetable yellow. Patterned cloth exports were mainly to Java, Sumatra and other eastern countries.

The fort finally fell into ruin in 1687 after an eight-month-long siege led to its fall at the hands of the Mughal emperor Aurangzeb, who ended the Qutb Shahi reign and took the last Golconda king, Abul Hassan Tana Shah, captive.

Diamonds
The Golconda fort used to have a vault where the famous Koh-i-Noor and Hope diamonds were once stored along with other diamonds.

Golconda is renowned for the diamonds found on the south-east at Kollur Mine near Kollur, Guntur district, Paritala and Atkur in Krishna district and cut in the city during the Kakatiya reign. At that time, India had the only known diamond mines in the world. Golconda was the market city of the diamond trade, and gems sold there came from a number of mines. The fortress-city within the walls was famous for diamond trade.

Its name has taken a generic meaning and has come to be associated with great wealth. Gemologists use this classification to denote a diamond with a complete (or almost-complete) lack of nitrogen; "Golconda" material is also referred to as "2A".

Many famed diamonds are believed to have been excavated from the mines of Golconda, such as:

 Daria-i-Noor
 Noor-ul-Ain
 Koh-i-Noor
 Hope Diamond
 Princie Diamond
 Regent Diamond
 Wittelsbach-Graff Diamond

By the 1880s, "Golconda" was being used generically by English speakers to refer to any particularly rich mine, and later to any source of great wealth.

During the Renaissance and the early modern eras, the name "Golconda" acquired a legendary aura and became synonymous for vast wealth. The mines brought riches to the Qutb Shahis of Hyderabad State, who ruled Golconda up to 1687, then to the Nizam of Hyderabad, who ruled after the independence from the Mughal Empire in 1724 until 1948, when the Indian integration of Hyderabad occurred. The siege of Golconda occurred in January 1687, when Mughal Emperor Aurangzeb led his forces to besiege the Qutb Shahi dynasty at Golconda fort (also known as the Diamond Capitol of its time) and was home to the Kollur Mine. The ruler of Golconda was the well entrenched Abul Hasan Qutb Shah.

The fort 

Golconda fort is listed as an archaeological treasure on the official "List of Monuments" prepared by the Archaeological Survey of India under The Ancient Monuments and Archaeological Sites and Remains Act. The lowest of these is the outermost enclosure entered by the "Fateh Darwaza" (Victory gate, so called after Aurangzeb’s triumphant army marched in through this gate) studded with giant iron spikes (to prevent elephants from battering them down) near the south-eastern corner. An acoustic effect can be experienced at Fateh Darwazaan, a hand clap at a certain point below the dome at the entrance reverberates and can be heard clearly at the 'Bala Hisar' pavilion, the highest point almost a kilometer away. This worked as a warning in case of an attack.

Bala Hissar Gate is the main entrance to the fort located on the eastern side. It has a pointed arch bordered by rows of scroll work. The spandrels have yalis and decorated roundels. The area above the door has peacocks with ornate tails flanking an ornamental arched niche. The granite block lintel below has sculpted yalis flanking a disc. The design of peacocks and lions is typical of Hindu architecture and underlies this fort's Hindu origins.

Jagadamba temple, located next to Ibrahim mosque and the king's palace, is visited by lakhs of devotees during Bonalu festival every year. Jagadamba temple is about 900 to 1,000 years old, dating back to early Kakatiya period. A Mahankali temple is located in the vicinity, within Golconda fort.

The facade consists of five arches, each with lotus medallions in the spandrels. The central arch is slightly wider and more ornate. The mosque inside is divided into two halls, a transverse outer hall and an inner hall entered through triple arches.

The fort also contains the tombs of the Qutub Shahi kings. They are encircled by gardens and numerous carved stones.

The two individual pavilions on the outer side of Golconda are built on a point which is quite rocky. The "Kala Mandir" is also located in the fort. It can be seen from the king's durbar (king's court) which was on top of the Golconda fort.

The other buildings found inside the fort are: Habshi Kamans (Abyssian arches), Ashlah Khana, Taramati mosque, Ramadas Bandikhana, Camel stable, private chambers (kilwat), Mortuary bath, Nagina bagh, Ramasasa's kotha, Durbar hall, Ambar khana etc.

Golconda ruling dynasties 
 Kakatiya dynasty
 Musunuri Nayakas
 Bahamani Sultans
 Qutb Shahi dynasty
 Mughal Empire
 Asaf Jahi dynasty

Naya Qila (New Fort) 

Naya Qila is an extension of Golconda fort which was turned into the Hyderabad Golf Club despite resistance from farmers who owned the land and various NGOs within the city. The ramparts of the new fort start after the residential area with many towers and the Hatiyan ka Jhad ("Elephant-sized tree")—an ancient baobab tree with an enormous girth. It also includes a war mosque. These sites are under restrictive access to the public because of the Golf Course.

Qutub Shahi tombs 

The tombs of the Qutub Shahi sultans lie about one kilometre north of Golconda's outer wall. These structures are made of beautifully carved stonework, and surrounded by landscaped gardens. They are open to the public and receive many visitors. It is one of the famous sight seeing places in Hyderabad.

Golconda Artillery Centre, Indian Army

Golconda Artillery Centre, Hyderabad was raised on 15 August 1962 as the Second Recruit Training Centre for the Regiment of Artillery. Golconda Artillery Centre is located in and around the Golconda fort. The Golconda centre has three training regiments and presently trains 2900 recruits at a time.

UNESCO World Heritage
The Golconda fort, and other Qutb Shahi dynasty Monuments of Hyderabad (the Charminar, and the Qutb Shahi Tombs) were submitted by the Permanent Delegation of India to UNESCO in 2010 for consideration as World Heritage Sites. They are currently included on India's "tentative list".

Influences

In popular culture 
 Aline, reine de Golconde (1760), story by Stanislas de Boufflers
 Aline, reine de Golconde (1766), opera by Pierre-Alexandre Monsigny
 Aline, reine de Golconde (1803), opera by Henri-Montan Berton
 Aline, reine de Golconde (1804), opera by François-Adrien Boieldieu
 Alina, regina di Golconda (1828), opera by Gaetano Donizetti
 Drottningen av Golconda (The Queen of Golconda, 1863), Swedish-language opera by Franz Berwald
 Russell Conwell's book Acres of Diamonds tells a story of the discovery of the Golconda mines.
 René Magritte's painting Golconda was named after the city.
 John Keats' early poem "On receiving a curious Shell" opens with the lines: "Hast thou from the caves of Golconda, a gem / pure as the ice-drop that froze on the mountain?"
 Golconda is referenced in the classical Russian ballet, La Bayadère (1877).
 Anthony Doerr's Pulitzer Prize–winning novel All the Light We Cannot See references the Golconda mines as the discovery place of the "Sea of Flames" diamond
 In Patrick O'Brian's novel The Surgeon's Mate, a character describes a particularly valuable diamond as being worth "half Golconda".

Places named after Golconda
 A city in Illinois, United States is named after Golconda.
 A city in Nevada, United States is named after Golconda.
 A village located in the southern part of Trinidad had given the name in the 19th century to a rich tract of land which was once a sugar-cane estate. Currently, mostly descendants of East Indian indentured servants occupy the village of Golconda.

Gallery

See also 

 Afanasiy Nikitin – the first European to visit Golconda
 History of Hyderabad
 Naya Qila
 Taramati Baradari

Citations

Further reading

External links 

 Qutb Shahi Architecture at Golconda
 

Tourist attractions in Hyderabad, India
Tourist attractions in Telangana
History of Telangana
Forts in Telangana
Medieval India
Buildings and structures in Hyderabad, India
Hyderabad State
Cultural heritage of India
Qutb Shahi architecture
Former populated places in India
Archaeological sites in Telangana
Former capital cities in India
Populated places established in the 10th century
Buildings on the Indian Archaeological Register
World Heritage Tentative List for India
Water Heritage Sites in India

hi:गोलकोण्डा
mr:गोवळकोंडा
sa:गोल्कोण्डदुर्गम्